Gongwang Street is a metro station on Line 6 of the Hangzhou Metro in China. It was opened on 30 December 2020, together with the Line 6. It is located in the Fuyang District of Hangzhou.

References 

Hangzhou Metro stations
2020 establishments in China